Grünten (also, Watcher of the Allgäu) is a mountain of Bavaria, Germany.
On the summit is a Gebirgsjäger monument, dedicated to German mountain troopers killed in World War One. Not far from there, on the lower crest, is a radio tower of the Bavarian Broadcasting Corporation. The cable car connecting the village of Rettenberg and the radio tower was closed to the public in 2014 and is now only used to transport material or members of staff up to the radio tower.

Geography 

The Grünten is located in the Oberallgäu region of southern Bavaria, and is one of the most northerly mountains of the Allgäu Alps. At its foot are the municipalities Rettenberg and Burgberg.

External links

References

Allgäu Alps
Mountains of Bavaria
Mountains of the Alps